Jo Nymo Matland (born 21 April 1987) is a Norwegian football defender.

Career

Early career
He signed a youth contract with Tromsø in 2004, He was a first-team squad member for the 2005 La Manga Cup. However, in the 2005 season he was loaned out to Tromsdalen.

Tippeligaen debut
In 2006, he was back in Tromsø, and started the season opener. He got two games in the Norwegian Premier League, Tippeligaen, that season. In 2007, he was loaned out to Tromsdalen again. The move was made permanent ahead of the 2008 season.

Sarpsborg 08
On 18 November 2010, he signed for Eliteserien side Sarpsborg 08.

Career statistics

References

1987 births
Living people
Sportspeople from Tromsø
Norwegian footballers
Norway youth international footballers
Association football defenders
Tromsø IL players
Tromsdalen UIL players
Sarpsborg 08 FF players
Aalesunds FK players
Brattvåg IL players
Hamarkameratene players
Lyn Fotball players
Eliteserien players
Norwegian First Division players
Norwegian Second Division players
Challenger Pro League players
Norwegian expatriate footballers
Expatriate footballers in Belgium
Norwegian expatriate sportspeople in Belgium
Royal Antwerp F.C. players